Coralliophila violacea, common name : the violet coral shell, is a species of sea snail, a marine gastropod mollusk in the family Muricidae, the murex snails or rock snails.

Description

Distribution
This species is distributed in the Red Sea and in the Indian Ocean along Aldabra, Chagos, Kenya, Madagascar and Tanzania, in the Indo-Pacific and along the Galapagos Islands

References

 Dautzenberg, P. (1923). Liste preliminaire des mollusques marins de Madagascar et description de deux especes nouvelles. Journal de Conchyliologie 68: 21-74
 Dautzenberg, Ph. (1929). Mollusques testacés marins de Madagascar. Faune des Colonies Francaises, Tome III
 Drivas, J. & M. Jay (1988). Coquillages de La Réunion et de l'île Maurice
 Oliverio M. (2008) Coralliophilinae (Neogastropoda: Muricidae) from the southwest Pacific. In: V. Héros, R.H. Cowie & P. Bouchet (eds), Tropical Deep-Sea Benthos 25. Mémoires du Muséum National d'Histoire Naturelle 196: 481–585. page(s): 486

External links

 

Gastropods described in 1836
Coralliophila